Raleigh Banking and Trust Company Building, also known as the Raleigh Building, is a historic bank office building located at Raleigh, North Carolina. It is an eleven-story, seven bays wide and three bays deep, Classical Revival style skyscraper. It is a steel frame and brick veneer building with white terra cotta ornamental elements.  The first three stories were built in 1913, with the upper eight stories added in 1928–1929.  The first three floors were radically renovated in 1935–1936, with the addition of Art Moderne design elements.

It was listed on the National Register of Historic Places in 1993.

References 

Office buildings on the National Register of Historic Places in North Carolina
Neoclassical architecture in North Carolina
Office buildings completed in 1929
Skyscraper office buildings in Raleigh, North Carolina
National Register of Historic Places in Raleigh, North Carolina